Stauridiosarsia is a genus of hydrozoans in the family Corynidae.

Species
 Stauridiosarsia baukalion (Pagès, Gili & Bouillon, 1992)
 Stauridiosarsia bicircella (Rees, 1977)
 Stauridiosarsia cliffordi (Brinckmann-Voss, 1989)
 Stauridiosarsia gemmifera (Forbes, 1848)
 Stauridiosarsia nipponica (Uchida, 1927)
 Stauridiosarsia ophiogaster (Haeckel, 1879)
 Stauridiosarsia producta (Wright, 1858)
 Stauridiosarsia reesi (Vannucci, 1956)
 Stauridiosarsia xiamensis (Xu, Huang & Guo, 2014)

References

Corynidae
Hydrozoan genera